Gainsford End Mill is a grade II listed tower mill at Gainsford End, near Toppesfield, Essex, England, which has been converted to a residence.

History
Gainsford End Mill was built in 1869  at a cost of £2000. It replaced a post mill which had stood on the site since the late eighteenth century. The mill was working until  and afterwards became derelict. The windshaft was installed in Duck End Mill, Finchingfield, when that mill was restored in 1958, although it was removed when a new wooden windshaft was fitted to that mill in 1986. It was converted to residential use in 2007.

Description

Gainsford End Mill is a five-storey brick tower mill with a domed cap winded by an eight-bladed  Fantail. When built it had four Patent sails carried on a cast-iron windshaft. The brake wheel drove a cast-iron wallower carried on a  cast-iron upright shaft. The  great spur wheel drove three pairs of millstones. The mill drove three pairs of millstones; two pairs were  diameter and the third pair were  diameter.

Millers
Lewis Steward 1874 - 1898
Joseph Chaplin 1902

References

Windmills in Essex
History of Essex
Grade II listed buildings in Essex
Tower mills in the United Kingdom
Grinding mills in the United Kingdom
Windmills completed in 1869
Buildings and structures in Braintree District
Grade II listed windmills
1869 establishments in England